The 2018–19 Marquette Golden Eagles women's basketball team represented Marquette University in the 2018–19 NCAA Division I women's basketball season. The Golden Eagles, led by fifth year head coach Carolyn Kieger, play their home games at the Al McGuire Center and were members of the Big East Conference. They finished the season 27–8, 15–3 in Big East in Big East play to win the Big East regular season title. They advanced to the championship game of the Big East women's tournament where they lost to DePaul. They received an at-large bid to the NCAA women's tournament where they defeated Rice in the first round before losing to Texas A&M in the second round.

On April 3, Kieger left her alma mater after five seasons, the last three of which ended in NCAA tournament appearances, for the Penn State opening. She finish with a 5 year record of 99–64.

Previous season
They finished the 2017–18 season 24–10, 16–2 in Big East play to share the regular season title with DePaul. They advanced to the championship game of the Big East women's tournament, where they lost to DePaul. They received an at-large bid to the NCAA women's tournament, where they defeated Dayton in the first round before losing to Louisville in the second round.

Roster

Schedule

|-
!colspan=9 style=|Exhibition

|-
!colspan=9 style=| Non-conference regular season

|-
!colspan=9 style=| Big East regular season

|-
!colspan=9 style=| Big East  Women's Tournament

|-
!colspan=9 style=| NCAA Women's Tournament

Rankings
2018–19 NCAA Division I women's basketball rankings

^Coaches did not release a Week 2 poll.

See also
2018–19 Marquette Golden Eagles men's basketball team

References

Marquette
Marquette Golden Eagles women's basketball seasons
Marquette
Marquette
Marquette